The 1939 Arizona Wildcats football team represented the University of Arizona in the Border Conference during the 1939 college football season.  In their first season under head coach Mike Casteel, the Wildcats compiled a 6–4 record (1–2 against Border opponents), finished in fourth place in the conference, and were outscored by their opponents, 113 to 109. The team captain was Tom Hargis.  The team played its home games at Arizona Stadium in Tucson, Arizona.

Schedule

References

Arizona
Arizona Wildcats football seasons
Arizona Wildcats football